Lacul Vrăjitoarelor is a natural freshwater lake in the town of Ocna Sibiului, Sibiu County, Transylvania, Romania. It is one of the many lakes of the Ocna Sibiului mine, a large salt mine which has one of the largest salt reserves in Romania. Lacul Vrăjitoarelor and Lacul Verde are the only freshwater lakes of the mine, with the others being salt lakes. The lake is very small and is becoming a swamp, which makes it unsuitable for swimming.

Name 
 Lacul Vrăjitoarelor  means  Lake of the Witches  in Romanian.

Lakes of the salt mine 
 Auster 
 Lake Avram Iancu-Ocniţa
 Balta cu Nămol 
 Brâncoveanu 
 Cloşca 
 Crişan
 Lacul Fără Fund 
 Gura Minei 
 Horea 
 Mâţelor 
 Negru
 Pânzelor 
 Rândunica 
 Verde (Freshwater lake)
 Vrăjitoarelor (Freshwater lake)

References 

Lakes of Sibiu County